Loxonematidae is an extinct taxonomic family of sea snails, marine gastropod molluscs.

This family has no subfamilies.

Genera
 Loxonema Phillips, 1841 - type genus of the family Loxonematidae

References

Prehistoric gastropods